Jeon Sang-Dae (born April 10, 1982) is a South Korean football player who has played as a forward.

His previous club is Gyeongnam FC and Daegu FC.

Club career
2004-2005 Ulsan Hyundai Mipo Dockyard
2006 Gyeongnam FC
2007-2008 Daegu FC

References
 K-League Player Record 

1982 births
Living people
Association football forwards
South Korean footballers
Gyeongnam FC players
Daegu FC players
K League 1 players